Mmanoko is a village in Kweneng District of Botswana. It is located 31 km north-east of the capital of Botswana, Gaborone, along the Gaborone–Molepolole road. The population was 763 in 2001 census.

References

Kweneng District
Villages in Botswana